Lorenzo Albaladejo Martínez (born 4 May 1990 in Murcia, Spain)  is a Paralympic athlete from Spain competing mainly in category T38 sprint events.

Personal 
Albaladejo was born 4 May 1990 in Murcia, Spain. He has cerebral palsy, a condition he has had since birth.  In 2012, he resided in San Javier. In 2012, he was one of several athletes honored at the Murcia Sports Merit Awards organized by the Spanish Sports Press Association in Murcia. In December 2013, he attended an event marking Spanish insurance company Santa Lucía Seguros becoming a sponsor of the Spanish Paralympic Committee, and consequently Plan ADOP which funds high performance Spanish disability sport competitors.  He chose to attend the event because he wanted to show support for this type of sponsorship.  In December 2013, he participated in an event related to Spain's constitution day at the Municipal Sports Centre Moratalaz in Madrid.

Athletics 
Albaladejo is a Paralympic athlete from Spain competing mainly in category T38 in sprint events.

During the 2011/2012 season, Albaladejo competed for the Murcia based Club Escuela de Atletismo San Javier and trained in  San Javier and Murcia. In 2012, he was the Spanish national champion in the 100 and 200 meter events. He competed at the 2012 European Stadskanaal, where he earned a pair of silver medals in the 100 meter and 200 meter T38 events. He competed in the 2012 Summer Paralympics in London, England where he finished 6th in the 100 meter event and 7th in the 200 meter event. He was the top European finisher in the 200 meter event. For the 2012/2013 athletics season, he competed for the Madrid-based Club Atletismo Gredos de San Diego and was coached by Jorge Marin. In July 2013, he participated in the 2013 IPC Athletics World Championships.

Notes

References

External links 
  
 

1990 births
Living people
Spanish disability athletes
Paralympic athletes of Spain
Athletes (track and field) at the 2012 Summer Paralympics
Medalists at the World Para Athletics European Championships
Plan ADOP alumni
Sportspeople from Murcia